The Barbados Independence Act 1966 (c. 37) is an Act of the Parliament of the United Kingdom that granted independence to Barbados with effect from 30 November 1966.  The Act also provided for the granting of a new constitution to take effect upon independence, which was done by the Barbados Independence Order 1966.

As a result of the Act, Barbados became the fourth English-speaking country in the West Indies to achieve full independence from the United Kingdom, after Jamaica, Trinidad & Tobago, and Guyana. At independence, Barbados became a member of the Commonwealth of Nations as a Commonwealth realm; prior to this, Barbados had been a fully self-governing British colony from 1961.

Background to enactment 
The bill was first presented in the House of Commons of the United Kingdom as the Barbados Independence Bill on 28 October 1966, by Secretary of State for the Colonies, Frederick Lee. It was passed in the House of Commons after a third reading and committee on 2 November 1966, without amendments.
It entered the House of Lords on 3 November 1966 and was read by Malcolm Shepherd, 2nd Baron Shepherd on 10 November 1966. It was passed in the House of Lords on 15 November 1966 without any amendments.

The bill received Royal assent on 17 November 1966, from Queen Elizabeth II. before taking effect on 30 November that year.

Barbados then remained a constitutional monarchy under the Barbadian monarch until eventually becoming a republic on 30 November 2021.

See also
 Barbados nationality law
 Saint Andrew's Day
 U.S. Monroe Doctrine

References 

 
 Barbados Independence Bill, UK Parliamentary Hansard debate of the bill
 Chronological table of the statutes; HMSO, London. 1993.

Further reading 
 
 

Independence acts in the Parliament of the United Kingdom
United Kingdom Acts of Parliament 1966
1966 in politics
1966 in international relations
1966 in Barbados
Barbados–United Kingdom relations
Barbados and the Commonwealth of Nations
United Kingdom and the Commonwealth of Nations